The Civic Committee for Human Rights (abbreviation CCHR (English) or GOLJP (Croatian)) a non-governmental non-profit organization in Croatia. It operates since 1992 and its goal is to protect and promote of human rights in Croatia.

References

External links
 Official website

Human rights organizations based in Croatia
Organizations established in 1992
1992 establishments in Croatia